Flora Sinensis is one of the first European natural history books about China, published in Vienna in 1656. Its author, Michael Boym, was a Jesuit missionary from Poland (then Polish–Lithuanian Commonwealth).

The book was the first description of an ecosystem of the Far East published in Europe. Boym underlined the medicinal properties of the Chinese plants. The book also included pleas for support of the Catholic Chinese emperor and each page contained a chronogram pointing to the date of 1655, the date of coronation of Emperor Leopold I as the King of Hungary, as Boym wanted to gain support of that monarch for his mission.

It is said that the Flora Sinensis was the first book that used the name "Flora" in this meaning, a book covering the plant world of a region. However, despite its title, the book covered not only plants, it obviously includes some species that are neither plants nor Chinese.

References

External links

  digitised copy of the book hosted at the Biodiversity Heritage Library

.Flora sinensis
Florae (publication)
Books about China
1656 books
Botany in Asia
Chinese encyclopedias
17th-century Latin books